The ABN AMRO Trophy was a three team limited overs cricket tournament held in Kenya during the 1994–95 season between associate cricket nations in preparation for their participation at the upcoming 1996 Cricket World Cup.

Points table

Group matches

1st match

2nd match

3rd match

4th match

5th match

6th match

Final
Kenya chose to bat in front of a 3,000 person home crowd but started poorly, slumping to 50/4. A partnership between Steve Tikolo and Maurice Odumbe helped resurrect the Kenyan innings to a relatively respectable 161, losing their last wicket after 47 overs. Dutch bowler Floris Jansen took four wickets for twenty runs. The Netherlands started their innings well, led by Peter Cantrell who scored 68 not out on the way to chase down the target after 39 overs. Jansen was awarded the Man of the Match for his bowling.

References

International cricket competitions from 1994–95 to 1997
Sport in Nairobi
International cricket competitions in Kenya
1994 in Kenyan cricket
1994 in Dutch cricket
1994 in Emirati cricket